One Wish is a 2010 American drama film directed by Felix Limardo and written by Ron Willens. It was filmed in Ventura, California. It stars Bella Thorne, Kevin Kilner, Christa B. Allen, Symba Smith and Kelsey Weber.  The film was released on November 26, 2010.

Synopsis
Jake Wylie (Kevin Kilner) is a happily married father of Molly (Christa B. Allen), who is a dance champion preparing for the most important dance tournament of her life. One day, he sees a three-year-old girl about to be hit by an oncoming automobile and does the heroic thing, quickly moving to save her life. Because of his good actions, The Messenger (Bella Thorne), an angel, grants him one wish. Jake has a big decision to make because whatever he wishes for will have a large impact on the lives of his family.

Cast
 Bella Thorne as The Messenger (Angel)
 Kevin Kilner as  Jake Wylie 
 Christa B. Allen as Molly Wylie 
 Symba Smith as Marti Wylie
 Kelsey Weber as Sara Wylie
 Jasmine Lowe as Katrina
 Ali Fussell as Alana
 Colleen Irene Boag as Patricia
 Albert Malafronte as Father Carl Stokes

References

External links 

2010 films
2010 drama films
American drama films
2010s English-language films
2010s American films